In finite group theory, an area of abstract algebra, a strongly embedded subgroup of a finite group G is a proper subgroup H of even order such that H ∩ Hg has odd order whenever g is not in H. 
 G has cyclic or generalized quaternion Sylow 2-subgroups and H contains the centralizer of an involution
 or G/O(G) has a normal subgroup of odd index isomorphic to one of the simple groups PSL2(q), Sz(q) or  PSU3(q) where q≥4  is a power of 2 and H is O(G)NG(S) for some Sylow 2-subgroup S.
 revised Suzuki's part of the proof.

 extended Bender's classification to groups with a proper 2-generated core.

References

Finite groups